Tom Djäwa (a.k.a. Djäwa Daygurrgurr) (born 1905 – March 23, 1980) was an Aboriginal Australian master painter and had created many works such as Murayana. Djäwa worked with bark painting and made wood sculptures as an expression of his art for over 30 years. As a result, many of his works are held in museums and private collections all over the globe.

Biography 
Djäwa was the son of Narritjnarritj and Djambarrpuygu. He was the grandson of Walamangu. Djäwa was born on an island called Milingimbi in Central Arnhem Land, Australia.  Djäwa is classified in the Yirritja moiety. When Djäwa was young, he lived on Elcho Island before the Macassans had arrived on the island. A Macassan man by the name Captain Dg Gassing renamed him as Mangalay with his uncle as his witness. Djäwa compared this event to a baptism.

Career 
Djäwa was a ceremonial leader for his clan called the Daygurrgurr and his language was Gupapuynu. He was also the leader for all of the Gapapuyngu clans.

He received this leadership role at the beginning of the 1950s. As a ceremonial leader, he had the power to determine what would be crafted in the camps he was in charge of. Due to Djäwa's influential position, he tried to get other clan leaders to come to Milingimbi. He hoped that through their engagement in "cultural activities" he would solidify his position as a  leader. He continued in his role as a leader for the Yolngu people at Milingimbi for approximately 30 years before he died.

Djäwa was good friends with Reverend Edgar Wells, a mission superintendent from 1949. They would spend a great deal of time together looking over works of art and discussing them at Wells' mission house. Wells' wife, Ann E. Wells, mentioned that the art became a "channel of understanding" between the Milingimbi artists and Edgar Wells. Djäwa and Wells worked closely together until Djäwa's death.

In featured media 
Djäwa appeared in two film documentaries by Cecil Holmes called Faces in the sun and Djalambu in 1963 and 1964.  In the documentary Djalambu, Djäwa conducted a re-enactment his father's Djalumbu ceremony.

Djäwa was drawn to the musical side of the arts as well. He recorded songs with Alice Moyle, an ethnomusicologist. He was also featured in part of the song Moikoi Song where he had played the clapsticks. It was recorded by Sandra LeBrun Holmes who was a part of the Milingimbi Mission in 1962 and featured on the Voyager Golden Record.

Dancing for Queen Elizabeth II 
In 1954, Djäwa and six other men travelled to Toowoomba to perform a ceremonial dance for the queen of England, Queen Elizabeth II, and the Duke of Edinburgh. According to Ann Wells, the wife of Edgar Wells, Djäwa had seen this event as "...a treasured and instructive journey into a new world."

Collections 
Some of Djäwa's works are displayed in these museums collections:

 National Gallery of Victoria
 National Museum of Australia
 Kluge-Ruhe Aboriginal Art Collection of the University of Virginia
 Art Gallery of New South Wales (Art Gallery NSW)

Exhibitions 

 The classic period: Arnhem Land barks from the 1960s–2000s, Aboriginal and Pacific Art, Waterloo, 5 March 2013 – 30 March 2013
 Art from Milingimbi: taking memories back, Art Gallery of New South Wales, Sydney, 12 November 2016 - 29 January 2017

References

Further reading 

 Mundine, Djon (1996). The Native Born: Object and Representations of Ramingining, Arnhem Land. Museum of Contemporary Art Sydney (July 1, 2000) ISBN 1875632441
 Pinchbeck, Cara (2016). Art from Milingimbi: taking memories back. Lindy Allen, Louise Hamby, Art Gallery of New South Wales. Sydney, N.S.W. ISBN 978-1-74174-128-5

Australian Aboriginal artists
1905 births
1980 deaths